The 2019–20 The Citadel Bulldogs basketball team represented The Citadel, The Military College of South Carolina in the 2019–20 NCAA Division I men's basketball season. The Bulldogs, led by fifth-year head coach Duggar Baucom, played their home games at McAlister Field House in Charleston, South Carolina, as members of the Southern Conference. They finished the season 6–24, 0–18 in SoCon play to finish in last place. They lost in the first round of the SoCon tournament to Wofford.

Previous season
The Bulldogs finished the 2018–19 season 12–18 overall, 4–14 in SoCon play to finish in a three-way tie for eighth place. In the SoCon tournament, they were defeated by Samford in the first round.

Roster

Schedule and results

|-
!colspan=12 style=| Regular season

|-
!colspan=12 style=| SoCon tournament
|-

|-

Source

References

The Citadel Bulldogs basketball seasons
Citadel Bulldogs
Citadel Bulldogs basketball
Citadel Bulldogs basketball